Steven Blake Crowder (born July 7, 1987) is an American-Canadian conservative political commentator, comedian, and media host.

Early in his career, Crowder worked for Fox News and posted satirical videos on conservative media platforms. He then began hosting Louder with Crowder, a daily political podcast and YouTube channel with conservative commentary and comedic content. It includes a recurring segment called "Change My Mind", in which Crowder invites passers-by to converse. 

In December 2012, Crowder and members of Americans for Prosperity were involved in an altercation at a demonstration in Michigan concerning the state's recently passed right-to-work law. Crowder's YouTube channel has been demonetized twice, first in 2019 after repeated use of racist and homophobic slurs. His channel was re-monetized after YouTube said Crowder addressed his behavior and content, and it was demonetized again in March 2021, with uploads suspended for a week, after violating YouTube's presidential election integrity policy for advancing false claims about the election's integrity. YouTube suspended the channel again for two weeks in October 2022 for violating its harassment, threats and cyberbullying policy. The channel had 5.94 million subscribers as of January 2023.  On March 3, 2023, Crowder announced on Russell Brand's show that he would be moving his show to Rumble.

Early life 
Crowder was born on July 7, 1987, in Detroit, Michigan. His mother was French Canadian, and at the age of three, his family moved to the Montreal suburb of Greenfield Park, Quebec, Canada where he would live for the rest of his childhood. Crowder attended Centennial Regional High School, and at the age of 18, he moved back to the United States. Crowder attended two semesters at Champlain College in Burlington, Vermont.

Career

Early career and Fox News
At age 12, he worked as a voice actor for the character Alan "The Brain" Powers on the children's television series Arthur. He began performing stand-up comedy at age 17. He then acted in a number of films, including the role of Doug Moore in the 2009 movie To Save a Life. From 2009 to 2012, Crowder worked for Fox News.

By 2009, Crowder regularly posted satirical videos on politically conservative media, including Pajamas Media and later at Andrew Breitbart's Big Hollywood. Crowder served as the master of ceremonies at the 2011 Conservative Political Action Conference (CPAC), and generated some controversy with a rap video he premiered at CPAC 2012.

December 2012 union protest
In December 2012, Crowder and members of Americans for Prosperity were involved in an altercation at a demonstration in Michigan concerning the state's recently passed right-to-work law. The incident began with an attempt by union activists to tear down the Americans for Prosperity tent, which was eventually successful. During the altercation, Crowder was punched several times by a union activist. Crowder posted an edited video of the incident to his YouTube channel that cut footage of the alleged assailant being pushed to the ground and getting back up, right before throwing the punches at Crowder. However, Fox News' broadcasts of the incident included footage of the man being pushed. The New York Times stated, "The same footage also shows that Mr. Crowder had his hand on that man's shoulder just before he tumbled to the ground, but, while the camera does not capture the whole sequence of events, it seems likely that the man was knocked to the ground as members of the two sides pushed against one other, not shoved down by Mr. Crowder." Crowder later released an unedited copy of the video.

An AFL–CIO spokesman, Eddie Vale, stated that the organization did not condone the tearing down of the Americans for Prosperity tent or the violence against Crowder and his group.

In March 2013, Ingham County Prosecutor Stuart Dunnings III declined to press charges against anyone involved in the December 2012 altercation. According to Dunnings, his office was originally sent an edited version of the video of Crowder's altercation. However, upon reviewing the unedited version, the prosecutor's office decided not to pursue the case because the union member had acted in self-defense.

Louder with Crowder
In October 2013, Fox News ended its relationship with Crowder. This was announced shortly after Crowder made negative statements about Fox News host Sean Hannity and about Fox News. In 2017, the Louder with Crowder program, featuring mainly comedic content and political commentary, became a daily program featured on Conservative Reviews new streaming service, CRTV. On December 3, 2018, CRTV merged with Glenn Beck's TheBlaze, where Crowder was hosted until December 2022, alongside his YouTube channel, which has existed since 2009.

"Change My Mind" is a regular segment conducted by Crowder in which he sits at a table with a sign including the phrase "Change My Mind" and invites people walking by, often students at a university campus, to change his mind on a controversial subject. A photograph of Crowder seated behind a sign in February 2018 reading "Male Privilege is a Myth | Change My Mind" outside the Texas Christian University campus became an Internet meme. Variations of the meme often feature humorously controversial statements in place of "Male Privilege is a Myth", such as "Pineapple goes on pizza | Change My Mind".

Francesca Tripodi, a sociologist at the University of North Carolina at Chapel Hill, said that Crowder is "very popular, especially among young, conservative voters". Stanford researcher Becca Lewis told Bloomberg News that while Crowder does not directly express white nationalist views, his channel "has some of the most overt racism of any of the shows I've looked at".  Crowder's channel faced similar criticism after he described CBS reporter Betty Yu's face as "aggressively Asian", with CBS and KPIX 5 condemning what they described as the "horrific, racist comments" and "demeaning Asian stereotypes" on his show.

Crowder's show has also seen success on Apple's podcast list, having remained on the top 100 list over the course of 2020. On YouTube, the Louder with Crowder podcast has 5.94 million subscribers and his secondary channel CrowderBits has approximately 1.21 million subscribers.

Violations of online policies
In June 2019, YouTube investigated Crowder for using racist and homophobic slurs targeting Carlos Maza in multiple videos reacting to the Vox series Strikethrough, which Maza hosts. Crowder referred to Maza as "Mr. Lispy queer", an "angry little queer", and a "gay Mexican". Crowder mocked Maza using a stereotypical gay voice, sometimes while wearing a t-shirt with Che Guevara on it that said "Socialism is for f*gs [sic]". In addition, Maza said that Crowder's fans have doxxed and harassed him. Maza said Crowder's videos about him are "dehumanizing, and it's something I thought YouTube would be more protective about because it brands itself as being a queer space". According to an analysis by Vox Media's The Verge, Crowder's videos "routinely contain egregious violations of YouTube's policies against cyberbullying". Crowder responded with a video where he said his use of slurs was "playful ribbing" and that "it's funny, it's a comedy show". He said that the investigation was "an example of a giant, multinational media conglomeration... attempting to squash a competitor". He also stated that he is opposed to doxxing and harassment.

YouTube concluded that the language used by Crowder "was clearly hurtful", but "the videos as posted don't violate our policies". It determined that Crowder had not encouraged his viewers to harass or dox Maza either on YouTube or other platforms and that the main point of his video was to respond to opinion. The decision to not suspend the channel drew considerable criticism. The next day, YouTube suspended the channel's monetization, because "a pattern of egregious actions harmed the broader community". Republican Senator Ted Cruz, who had previously appeared on Crowder's show, criticized YouTube's demonetization of Crowder's account, and Crowder stated on his Twitter account that, "Vox is still going to be pissed" because he was not removed from the platform. In August 2020, YouTube re-monetized some of Crowder's content on the site, stating that Crowder had satisfactorily addressed the issues with his behavior and content. 

Crowder announced in February 2021 that he filed a lawsuit against Facebook, alleging he was unfairly censored by the platform. The next month, YouTube suspended Crowder's channel for one week for violating its presidential election integrity policy by advancing false claims about the 2020 United States presidential election in Nevada and again indefinitely demonetized his account. His account was then given a second strike on the platform for "reveling in or mocking" the killing of Ma'Khia Bryant in a video he posted, and Crowder responded by announcing that he had filed a lawsuit against YouTube seeking an injunction.

YouTube suspended his channel on October 27, 2022, for two weeks for violating its policy on harassment, threats and cyberbullying. Crowder alleged that the suspension was election interference because it lasted through the November 8, 2022, midterm election day.

Dispute with The Daily Wire
In January 2023, Crowder revealed on Louder with Crowder that he had received a term sheet from a conservative media outlet that he left unnamed. Crowder listed the offer's stipulations that, if he were to be demonetized or removed from platforms such as YouTube, Facebook or the iTunes Store, his compensation would be cut substantially during that period. He criticized this as a symptom of right-wing media not fighting back against, but rather implicitly condoning, Big Tech censorship, stating that "Big Tech is in bed with Big Con". 

It was later confirmed that the unnamed media outlet was The Daily Wire. Jeremy Boreing, the CEO of The Daily Wire, claimed Crowder had misrepresented the terms of the contract and that the contract would have paid Crowder $50 million over four years. Furthermore, Boreing asserted that the stipulation was necessary to ensure profitability. Daily Wire co-founder Ben Shapiro also criticized Crowder on Twitter, stating that Crowder deliberately self-censors on his YouTube channel in order to avoid being penalized, and thus was similarly guilty of compliance with social media censorship.

Personal life 
Crowder is a Christian. He married his wife Hilary in August 2012 and wrote about the benefits of remaining abstinent before his marriage.

In July 2021, Crowder underwent a surgical operation in which titanium bars were inserted into his chest in order to counteract his congenital condition of pectus excavatum (sunken chest). The surgery caused fluid to accumulate in his lungs, which he called "excruciatingly painful". Several weeks later, he was rushed to the hospital due to a collapsed lung. In August 2021, as Crowder was still recovering from both treatments, his wife gave birth to twins—a son, Magnus, and a daughter, Charlotte.

Filmography

References

External links 

 
 
 

1987 births
Living people
21st-century American comedians
American Christian writers
American emigrants to Canada
American people of French-Canadian descent
American YouTubers
American male child actors
American male voice actors
Anglophone Quebec people
Articles containing video clips
Canadian Christians
Canadian YouTubers
Conservative media in Canada
Commentary YouTubers
Fox News people
Canadian male child actors
Canadian male voice actors
Male critics of feminism
Blaze Media people
News YouTubers
YouTube channels launched in 2006
YouTube controversies
Conservative media in the United States
Champlain College alumni